The five principal meridians of Alaska are the Copper River meridian (established 1905), Fairbanks meridian (adopted 1910), Kateel River meridian (adopted 1956), Seward meridian (adopted 1911) and Umiat meridian (adopted 1956).

Initial points

See also
List of principal and guide meridians and base lines of the United States
Public Land Survey System

References

External links

 
 

Meridians (geography)
Meridians and base lines of the United States
Regions of Alaska